Sir Alexander Bradshaw Clegg (13 June 1909 – 20 January 1986 in Yorkshire) was an English educationalist. He was the innovative Chief Education Officer of the West Riding of Yorkshire County Council for whom he worked from 1945 to 1974.

The son of a schoolmaster, Clegg was born in Long Eaton, Derbyshire, and was educated at Long Eaton Grammar School and Bootham School before attending Clare College, Cambridge, where he took a degree in modern languages. When he completed his degree he attended the London Day Training College. He then got a job at St Clement Danes' Holborn Estate Grammar School, where he taught French and games between 1932 and 1937.

Between 1939 and 1945, Clegg worked for Birmingham, Cheshire, and Worcestershire education authorities before being appointed, in 1945, to the post of Deputy Chief Education Officer of the West Riding at the age of 34. The West Riding started on the road to becoming a pioneering and innovative authority when later that year he was appointed Chief Education Officer. During his tenure at the West Riding, Clegg was instrumental in introducing the first of thousands of Middle schools to the United Kingdom as part of a change to three-tier education initially in Hemsworth.

He was instrumental in founding Bretton Hall College which opened in 1949. His focus was always on children as learners.

Clegg was knighted in the  birthday honours list of June 1965.

Papers of Sir Alec Clegg are held at West Yorkshire Archive Service in Wakefield.

His nephew is David Attenborough.

Bibliography 
 The Excitement of Writing (1964)
 Children in Distress (1969)
 Excitement of Writing (1970)
 Changing Primary School (1972)
 "Recipe for Failure" (National Children's Home convocation lecture, 1972)
 Changing Primary School: Its Problems and Priorities (1972)
 Enjoying Writing: Further Collection of Children's Poetry and Prose (1973)

References

External links 
Talk given by Sir Alec Clegg at Bingley College of Education in 1974
 Lecture by Clegg, 1970, The Arthur Mellows Memorial Lecture: Education in Society

People educated at Bootham School
Alumni of Clare College, Cambridge
People associated with the University of Leeds
Fellows of King's College London
People from Long Eaton
1909 births
1986 deaths
Knights Bachelor